The Big Fun Show was a short-lived radio BBC programme that aired between January and February 1988.  There were six half-hour episodes, and it was broadcast on BBC Radio 4.  It starred Paul Merton, John Irwin, Tony Hawks, Josie Lawrence, Neil Mullarkey, and Julian Clary.

It was produced and directed by David Tyler.

Notes and references

BBC Radio 4 programmes
1988 radio programme debuts